The Bell Aerosystems Lunar Landing Research Vehicle (LLRV, nicknamed the Flying Bedstead) was a Project Apollo era program to build a simulator for the Moon landings. The LLRVs were used by the FRC, now known as the NASA Armstrong Flight Research Center, at Edwards Air Force Base, California, to study and analyze piloting techniques needed to fly and land the Apollo Lunar Module in the Moon's low gravity environment.

The research vehicles were vertical take-off vehicles that used a single jet engine mounted on a gimbal so that it always pointed vertically. It was adjusted to cancel 5/6 of the vehicle's weight, and the vehicle used hydrogen peroxide rockets which could fairly accurately simulate the behavior of a lunar lander.

Success of the two LLRVs led to the building of three Lunar Landing Training Vehicles (LLTVs), an improved version of the LLRV, for use by Apollo astronauts at the Manned Spacecraft Center in Houston, Texas, predecessor of NASA's Johnson Space Center. One LLRV and two LLTVs were destroyed in crashes, but the rocket ejection seat system safely recovered the pilot in all cases.

The final phase of every Apollo landing was manually piloted by the mission commander. Because of landing site selection problems, Neil Armstrong, Apollo 11 commander, said his mission would not have been successful without extensive training on the LLTVs.  Selection for LLTV training was preceded by helicopter training. In a 2009 interview, astronaut Curt Michel stated, "For airborne craft, the helicopter was the closest in terms of characteristics to the lunar lander. So if you didn't get helicopter training, you knew you weren't going. That sort of gave it away."  Even Tom Stafford and Gene Cernan did not get LLTV training for their Apollo 10 mission which was the first flight of the Lunar Module to the Moon, because NASA "didn't have plans to land on Apollo 10" so "there wasn't any point in ... training in the LLTV."  Cernan only got this training after being assigned as backup commander for Apollo 14, and in 1972 was the last to fly the LLTV while training as commander for Apollo 17, the final landing mission.

History
Built of aluminum alloy trusses, the LLRVs were powered by a General Electric CF700-2V turbofan engine with a thrust of 4,200 lbf (19 kN), mounted vertically in a gimbal. The engine lifted the vehicle to the test altitude and was then throttled back to support five-sixths of the vehicle's weight, simulating the reduced gravity of the Moon. Two hydrogen peroxide lift rockets with thrust that could be varied from 100 to 500 lbf (440 to 2,200 N) handled the vehicle's rate of descent and horizontal movement. Sixteen smaller hydrogen peroxide thrusters, mounted in pairs, gave the pilot control in pitch, yaw and roll.

The pilot had an ejection seat. On activation, it propelled the pilot upward from the vehicle with an acceleration of roughly 14 times the force of gravity for about a half second.  From the ground, it was sufficient to propel the seat and pilot to an altitude of about  where the pilot's parachute could be automatically and successfully deployed. Manufactured by Weber Aircraft LLC, it was one of the first zero-zero ejection seats, capable of saving the operator even if the aircraft was stationary on the ground, a necessity given the LLRV's low and slow flight envelope.

After conceptual planning and meetings with engineers from Bell Aerosystems, Buffalo, New York, a company with experience in vertical takeoff and landing (VTOL) aircraft, NASA issued Bell a $50,000 study contract in December 1961.  Bell had independently conceived a similar, free-flying simulator, and out of this study came the NASA Headquarters' endorsement of the LLRV concept, resulting in a $3.6 million production contract awarded to Bell on February 1, 1963, for delivery of the first of two vehicles for flight studies at the FRC within 14 months.

LLRV#1 was shipped from Bell to FRC in April.  LLRV#2 was also shipped at the same time, but in parts.  Because of a potential cost overrun, the FRC Director, Paul Bickle, decided to have it assembled and tested at FRC.  The emphasis then was on LLRV#1.  It was first readied for flight on a tilt table constructed at FRC to evaluate its engine operation without actually flying it.  The scene then shifted to the old South Base area of Edwards.

The first three flights of #1 were made on October 30, 1964 by FRC's senior research test pilot, Joe Walker. He continued to pilot a number of flights through December 1964, after which flights were shared with Don Mallick, also a FRC research pilot, and Jack Kleuver, the Army's senior helicopter test pilot.  Familiarization flights were also made by NASA Manned Spacecraft Center (later Johnson Space Center) pilots Joseph Algranti and H.E. Ream.

Modifications were later made to the cockpits of both LLRVs to better simulate the actual Lunar Module.  These included the addition of the LM's three-axis hand controller and throttle.  A Styrofoam cockpit enclosure was also added to simulate the pilot's restricted view in the LM.

The final LLRV flight at FRC took place on November 30, 1966.  In December 1966, vehicle #1 was shipped to Houston, followed by #2 in January 1967.  During the preceding two years, a total of 198 flights of LLRV#1 and six flights of LLRV#2 had been flown without a serious accident.

The first LLRV flight by Neil Armstrong was made in vehicle #1 on March 27, 1967 from its base at a corner of Ellington Air Force Base, the headquarters for Johnson Space Center's aircraft operations. Joe Algranti, chief of JSC's Aircraft Operations Division, and test pilot H.E. Ream also made flights that month.

On May 6, 1968, Armstrong was forced to use LLRV #1's ejection seat from about  altitude after a control problem, and had about four seconds on his full parachute before landing on the ground unhurt. The accident investigation board found that the fuel for the vehicle's attitude control thrusters had run out and that high winds were a major factor. As a result, the decision was made by JSC management to terminate further LLRV flights, as the first LLTV was about to be shipped from Bell to Ellington to begin ground and flight testing.

Lunar Landing Training Vehicle
Negotiations between JSC and Bell Aerosystems for three LLTVs, an improved training version of the LLRV, were initiated in October 1966 and a $5.9 million contract for three vehicles was finally signed in March 1967. In June 1968, the first vehicle was delivered by Bell to Ellington to begin its ground and flight testing by JSC's Aircraft Operations Division (AOD).  AOD's head, Joe Algranti, was the principal test pilot for its first flight in August 1968. Flight testing continued until December 8, when Algranti lost control during a flight to expand the vehicle's speed envelope. He managed to eject just three-fifths of a second before the vehicle hit the ground, the close call believed to be as a result of his attempt to regain control.

The accident investigation found that the ground controllers had elected not to monitor in real time the attitude thrusters that controlled the vehicle's yaw motion, and, at the velocity Algranti was flying, the thrusters had been overpowered by the LLTV's aerodynamic forces, causing Algranti to lose control. Due to tight cost constraints on the LLRV and LLTV, wind tunnel testing had been avoided in favor of careful flight testing for evaluation of the vehicles' aerodynamic characteristics. After reviewing the results of the crash investigation, however, it was decided that the third LLTV be loaded into NASA's Super Guppy and flown to the Langley Research Center in Virginia for testing in its full-scale wind tunnel. Testing was initiated on January 7, 1968 and ended one month later on February 7.

It was quickly determined that the cause of the divergence was the Styrofoam cockpit enclosure. As the vehicle's sideslip angle reached minus two degrees, a yawing force rapidly built up that exceeded the ability of the yaw thrusters to counteract. The fix decided on was simply to remove the top of the enclosure, thus venting it and eliminating the excessive yawing force. It was also possible from the wind tunnel results to develop a preliminary flight envelope for the LLTV, defining its allowable maximum airspeed at various angles of angle of attack and sideslip. All this had to be verified by flight test, however, since it was not possible in the tunnel to obtain good data with the engine running.

A high level LLTV Flight Readiness Review Board was appointed on March 5, 1969 by JSC Director Dr. Robert Gilruth. It consisted of him as chairman, with board members Chris Kraft, head of Mission Operations; George Low, head of JSC's Apollo Program; Max Faget, JSC's Director of Engineering and astronaut Deke Slayton, Director of Flight Crew Operations. The board reviewed the wind tunnel results, and on March 30 gave approval for the resumption of test flights in LLTV#2. The test program of 18 flights, all flown by H.E. Ream, was successfully completed on June 2. Hence, in the month before the Apollo 11 launch Armstrong was able to complete his LLTV flight training. He commented after his return:

In Armstrong's 2005 authorized biography First Man: The Life of Neil A. Armstrong, astronaut Bill Anders is quoted as describing the LLTV as "a much unsung hero of the Apollo Program". Although Armstrong had to eject from the LLRV, no other astronaut ever had to eject from the LLTV, and every Lunar Module pilot through the final Apollo 17 mission trained in the LLTV and flew to a landing on the Moon successfully.

LLRV#2 was eventually returned to the Armstrong Flight Research Center, where it is on display as an artifact of the center's contribution to the Apollo program. In January 1971 LLTV#3 was destroyed while testing a major modification to the LLTV's computer system. Its test pilot, Stuart Present, was able to eject safely. The sole surviving late-model LLTV, NASA 952, is on display at the Johnson Space Center.

Lunar Sim Mode 

There were two distinct modes of flight for the LLRV and LLTV. The basic mode was with the engine fixed so that it remained 'normal' with respect to the body.

In the gimbaled "Lunar Sim Mode," the free-gimbaled turbofan engine was allowed to swivel and was kept pointing downward to Earth's center of mass regardless of the LLRV's attitude; this allowed the vehicle to tilt at the far greater angles that would be typical of hovering and maneuvering above the lunar surface. Despite its ungainly appearance, the LLRV was equipped with a highly sophisticated array of early sensors (mainly Doppler radar) and computational hardware. The system had no specific name, but the effect it produced was called "Lunar Sim Mode." This was the highest degree of hardware-based simulation. It was not a system to unburden the pilot, as an autopilot does, nor was it meant to introduce any sort of safety or economy.

Lunar Sim Mode can also be thought of as a mixture of stability augmentation, recalculation of vertical acceleration according to the lunar gravity constant, all followed by accompanied instantaneous corrective action. The LLRV's Lunar Sim Mode was even able to correct for wind gusts within milliseconds, as they would have disturbed the impression of a missing atmosphere.

FRC test pilot Don Mallick's comments following the vehicle's first flight in the lunar simulation mode illustrate the experience of piloting the LLRV:

Deke Slayton, then NASA's Chief Astronaut, later said there was no way to simulate a Moon landing except by flying the LLRV.

Specifications (LLRV)

Control system

The electronic control system for the Lunar Landing Training Vehicle  was developed for NASA by Bell Aerosystems, Inc. which had engineering facilities located in Niagara Falls, New York. The LLTV was a second generation vehicle, after the Lunar Landing Research Vehicle, used by NASA Apollo Program astronauts to develop piloting skills. The LLTV provided Apollo program commanders the opportunity to experience the flight characteristics associated with the 1/6 gravity conditions on the Moon. The first LLTV vehicle was assembled at Ellington Airforce Base in Houston, Texas in 1967. Three LLTV vehicles were eventually delivered to Ellington AFB. The last remaining of the three LLTV vehicles is on display at the Johnson Spacecraft Center in Houston, Texas.

The electronic control system was designed with redundant channels that used 2 of 2 logic. The outputs of each primary channel were compared on a continuous basis. If a fault was detected in the primary control system, then control was automatically switched to an identical backup channel and the pilot immediately took measures to bring the vehicle to the ground. All the controls were analog circuits utilizing Burr-Brown transistor amplifier modules and other analog components.

Aircraft on display

Two of the five vehicles survive. LLRV-2 is on display at the Air Force Flight Test Museum at Edwards Air Force Base. It was lent to the museum by NASA in 2016.

LLTV-3 (LLTV NASA 952) is on display at the Johnson Space Center. Another vehicle, a replica of NASA 952, is in a partially complete state in the aircraft boneyard at the Yanks Air Museum.

See also

References

External links

LLRV/TV flight summary (sci.space.history post)
LLTV FRRB transcript
Pictures
Pictures
Conference video from meeting where 4 Moon walkers discuss the value of the LLTV
Neil Armstrong presentation on LLRV/TV (video from the 51st SETP Symposium)

Apollo program hardware
Bell aircraft
Mixed-power aircraft
NASA aircraft
Rocket-powered aircraft
1960s United States experimental aircraft
VTOL aircraft
Aircraft related to spaceflight
Aircraft first flown in 1964